The Bridge designated NEHBS No. AP00-252 near Royal, Nebraska built in 1911 was listed on the National Register of Historic Places in 1992. The bridge was fabricated by the Lackawanna Steel Co. and built by the Western Bridge & Construction Co. of Omaha, Nebraska at cost of $1,149.

When listed on the National Register, it was one of the last two surviving kingpost truss bridges in the state;  the other was the Verdigris Creek Bridge (c.1918), also in Antelope County near Royal. It seems that the bridge no longer exists.  The site is not listed on Nebraska State Historical Society's website.  It was delisted from the National Register in 2019.

References

External links

Bridges on the National Register of Historic Places in Nebraska
Bridges completed in 1911
Bridges in Antelope County, Nebraska
Road bridges in Nebraska
King post truss bridges in the United States
1911 establishments in Nebraska
Former National Register of Historic Places in Nebraska
National Register of Historic Places in Antelope County, Nebraska